The Um Adawi Granites are igneous rocks exposed in the southeastern part of the Sinai Peninsula. They exhibit field relations, petrographic characteristics, and chemical characteristics similar to the island arc older granitoids of the Arabian-Nubian Shield. They have a batholithic dimension and occur as composite plutons intruding the metasediments and the metavolcanics, while the younger granites intrude them.

Petrographically, the rocks are homogeneous, light to dark grey and  medium- to coarse-grained. They consist of quartz monzodiorite, tonalite and granodiorite. Plagioclase (An21-32), quartz, k-feldspar, hornblende and biotite represent the essential minerals. Accessory minerals are apatite and Fe-Ti oxides.

Whole rock and mineral chemistry indicate that the Um Adawi older granites are calc-alkaline with metaluminous signature. They were emplaced in a compressional regime in an arc tectonic setting within a crust of about 30 km thickness. The rare earth element patterns of these granites suggest that they were subduction related, supporting the obtained magmatic affinity and the tectonic setting.

References
M. G. Shahien and Obeid, M. A., 2002, Geochemistry and Petrogenesis of the Early-orogenic Older Granites at the Um Adawi Area, Southeastern Sinai, Egypt, Egypt. J. Geol.

Igneous rocks